UK Government Investments (UKGI) is a company owned by the Government of the United Kingdom which combines the former functions of the Shareholder Executive and UK Financial Investments based in London, England.

UKGI manages a portfolio of 17 businesses, including NatWest Group, Channel 4 and Urenco Group.

Vindi Banga is the chairman and Charles Donald is the chief executive.

List of companies
As of October 2021, the following public sector and state owned enterprises, wholly or partially owned, which the UKGI works with are:

 Atomic Weapons Establishment
 British Business Bank
 Channel Four Television Corporation
 Defence Equipment and Support
 Government Property Agency
 HM Land Registry
 Homes England
 National Highways
 National Nuclear Laboratory
 NATS Holdings
 NatWest Group
 Nuclear Decommissioning Authority
 National Nuclear Laboratory
 Ordnance Survey
 OneWeb
 Post Office Ltd
 Reclaim Fund Ltd
 The Royal Mint
 UK Asset Resolution
 UK Export Finance
 UK Infrastructure Bank
 URENCO

Senior leadership 

 Chairman: Vindi Banga (since September 2021)
 Chief Executive: Charles Donald (since March 2020)

List of former chairmen 

 Robert Swannell (2016–2021)

List of former chief executives 

 Mark Russell (2016–2019)

References

External links
 UK Government Investments

Government-owned companies of the United Kingdom
HM Treasury